Cushamen is a  department located in the north west of Chubut Province in Argentina.

The provincial subdivision has a population of about 17,000 inhabitants in an area of  16,250km², and its capital city is Cushamen.
The name means loneliness in the Tehuelche language.

Settlements
 Buenos Aires Chico
 Cholila
 Cushamen
 Hoyo de Epuyén
 El Maitén
 Epuyén
 Gualjaina
 Lago Epuyén
 Lago Puelo
 Las Golondrinas, Argentina
 Leleque
 Lago Rivadavia
 Fitamiche
 El Portezuelo
 El Molle
 Río Chico
 El Mallín

External links
Information about Cushamen (English)

Departments of Chubut Province
Mapuche language